Lazonby is a village and civil parish in the Lower Eden Valley of Cumbria; it is located about  north north-east of Penrith and 24 miles (38 km) south of the Scottish Borders.
The total population of the ward of Lazonby, which also includes the nearby villages of North Dykes, Great Salkeld and Salkeld Dykes, was 1,425 at the time of the 2001 UK Census; this figure included 1,011 people between the ages of 16 and 74, of whom 675 were in employment. At the time of the 2011 Census, the population had decreased to 976.

Description

The village has one church, one chapel, two pubs (the Midland Hotel and the Joiner's Arms), a primary school, retained fire station, a Lakes & Dales Co-operative supermarket and post office, livestock auction mart, swimming pool and campsite , railway station (part of the Settle-Carlisle line) and the Bell's of Lazonby bakery complex. There is also an independent wooden toy shop, Croglin Toys & Designs (www.croglindesigns.co.uk) which is located in the old school (approx. 18th century), and an independent petrol station. The village has its own village hall with snooker club and allotments.

The parish church of St. Nicholas forms a united benefice with churches at nearby Great Salkeld and Kirkoswald. The church was rebuilt in 1864-6 to a design by Anthony Salvin, at the expense of the Macleans of Lazonby Hall.  A notable feature is the woodwork executed by Canon B W Wilson, Rector 1877-1920. This can be seen on the south door, north vestry door, the pulpit and the chancel, organ and tower screens. There is an imposing unornamented wheel cross at top of the graveyard, possibly 10th century. There are 4 bells hung for full-circle ringing.

In recent years many new housing developments have sprung up in the village. The village today is lived in mostly by people who work in either Penrith or Carlisle.

The civil parish of Lazonby contains no other villages but does include the settlements of Baronwood and Brackenbank. At Low Plains there is a mineral water bottling plant which bottles "Aqua Pura" mineral water.  At one time the parish included the Chapelry of Plumpton within which were the settlements of Salkeld Gate, Brockleymoor, Plumpton Foot and Theifside. Plumpton, (or Plumpton Wall) was a chapelry or township of Lazonby until 1866.

Events

Kirkoswald Methodist Youth Guild, which is for 11 plus, have been doing a local pantomime for more than 40 years now in the local village hall. They meet up and do other activities throughout the year, but the pantomime has become somewhat of a local legend and people come from far and wide to see it.

Since 2008 there has been a bi-annual music concert in Lazonby which takes place on the school field. Featuring local and national bands, Lazonby Fest took place on 5 July 2008 and Lazonby Live took place on 12 June 2010. The festival's purpose is to raise money for the local school and other local charities. The festival took a break in 2012 due to the Olympics and the Diamond Jubilee but Lazonby Live returned on 7 September 2013 at a new location, Nunwick Cricket Club in Great Salkeld.

Governance

An electoral ward exists in the same name. This ward stretches south to Great Salkeld with a total population taken at the 2011 Census of 1,388.

See also

Listed buildings in Lazonby

References

External links
 Cumbria County History Trust: Lazonby (nb: provisional research only – see Talk page)

 Hear the church bells of Lazonby here

Villages in Cumbria
Civil parishes in Cumbria